The Aleutian Range is a major mountain range located in southwest Alaska. It extends from Chakachamna Lake (80 miles/130 km southwest of Anchorage) to Unimak Island, which is at the tip of the Alaska Peninsula. It includes all of the mountains of the Peninsula. The Aleutian Range is special because of its large number of active volcanoes, which are also part of the larger Aleutian Arc. The mainland part of the range is about 600 miles (1000 km) long. The Aleutian Islands are (geologically) a partially submerged western extension of the range that stretches for another 1,600 km (1000 mi). However the official designation "Aleutian Range" includes only the mainland peaks and the peaks on Unimak Island. The range is almost entirely roadless wilderness. Katmai National Park and Preserve, a large national park within the range, must be reached by boat or plane.

The core Aleutian Range can be divided into three mountain groups. Listed from southwest to northeast, they are:

 Mountains of the Alaska Peninsula and Unimak Island
 Chigmit Mountains
 Neacola Mountains

See Aleutian Islands for the continuation of the range to the west of Unimak Island. Just to the north of the Aleutian Range are the Tordrillo Mountains, the southeasternmost extent of the Alaska Range.

Selected mountains:
 Mount Redoubt (3,108 m), Chigmit Mountains
 Iliamna Volcano (3,054 m), Chigmit Mountains
 Mount Neacola, (2,873 m), Neacola Mountains
 Mount Shishaldin (2,857 m), Unimak Island
 Mount Pavlof (2,715 m), Alaska Peninsula
 Mount Veniaminof (2,508 m), Alaska Peninsula
 Isanotski Peaks (2,446 m), Unimak Island
 Mount Denison (2,318 m), Alaska Peninsula
 Mount Griggs, (2,317+ m), Alaska Peninsula
 Mount Douglas (2,153 m), Alaska Peninsula
 Mount Chiginagak (2,134 m), Alaska Peninsula
 Double Peak (2,078 m), Chigmit Mountains
 Mount Katmai (2,047 m), Alaska Peninsula
 Pogromni Volcano (2,002 m), Unimak Island

Volcanic eruptions 

Two volcanoes erupted during the summer of 2008 on the eastern Aleutian Islands. On July 12, 2008, Mount Okmok erupted, and it continued to erupt for a month. A giant, rapidly moving ash and gas cloud shot up to a height of 15,240 m as a result of this eruption. 

Mount Kasatochi was home to the other eruption, which occurred on August 7 and 8. This eruption also sent up a gas cloud about 15,000 high. Together, these two power volcanic eruptions deposited emissions of trace gases an aerosols into the atmosphere. These emissions formed a sulfate aerosol layer that totaled a transfer of 1.6 Tg of SO2 into the stratosphere and disturbed flights over this area  for a short period following the eruptions.

Earthquakes 
The 7.9 Mw Aleutian Islands earthquake occurred in June 2014 at an intermediate depth of 107 km. The quake was caused by oblique normal faulting along the Aleutian Trench, a convergent boundary where the Pacific plate is subducting underneath the North American plate at around 59 mm/year.

See also 
List of earthquakes in Alaska

References

External links
 

 
Mountains of Aleutians East Borough, Alaska
Mountains of Kenai Peninsula Borough, Alaska
Mountains of Kodiak Island Borough, Alaska
Mountains of Lake and Peninsula Borough, Alaska
Volcanic arcs
Mountains of Alaska
Mountain ranges of Alaska